Albert E. Douglas MacKenzie (1936 – April 26, 2019) was a Canadian football player who played for the Saskatchewan Roughriders. He later was ordained as an Anglican priest in 1986.

References

1936 births
2019 deaths
Players of Canadian football from Ontario
Canadian football running backs
Western Mustangs football players
Saskatchewan Roughriders players
Sportspeople from Chatham-Kent